Cobusca Veche is a commune in the Anenii Noi District of Moldova. It is composed of two villages, Cobusca Veche and Florești.

References

Communes of Anenii Noi District